Cousin Larry may refer to:
Larry Appleton of Perfect Strangers
Cousin Lawrence of Kim Possible